Big Fella is a 1937 British musical drama film directed by J. Elder Wills and starring Paul Robeson, Elisabeth Welch and Roy Emerton. It is loosely based on the novel Banjo by Harlem Renaissance writer Claude McKay.

Plot
Big Fella is set on the docks and streets of Marseilles. Paul Robeson stars in the leading role, as a street-wise but honest dockworker who struggles with deep issues of integrity and human values. Elisabeth Welch plays opposite him as a café singer in love with him. Robeson's wife, Eslanda Robeson, appears as the café owner.

Reception
The movie received praise, particularly for the music, featuring Robeson and Welch, and for Robeson's performance.

Cast
 Paul Robeson as Banjo
 Elisabeth Welch as Amanda 'Manda'
 Roy Emerton as Spike
 James Hayter as Chuck
 Lawrence Brown as Corney
 Eldon Gorst as Gerald Oliphant 
 Marcelle Rogez as Marietta
 Eric Cowley as Ferdy Oliphant 
 Joyce Kennedy as Mrs. Oliphant  
 Dino Galvani as Gendarme
 Anthony Holles as Gendarme 
 Margaret Rutherford as Nanny

References

External links
 

1937 films
British musical drama films
1930s musical drama films
British black-and-white films
Films set in France
Films based on American novels
Films directed by J. Elder Wills
Films shot at Beaconsfield Studios
Films scored by Jack Beaver
1937 drama films
1930s English-language films
1930s British films